Rainbow skink may refer to:

 Lampropholis delicata from Australia, otherwise known as garden skink
 Trachylepis margaritifera from Africa, otherwise known as rainbow mabuya
 Trachylepis quinquetaeniata from Africa, otherwise known as five-lined mabuya

See also
Skink

Animal common name disambiguation pages